Vincent Auclair (born August 9, 1965, in Laval, Quebec) is a Canadian politician and notary. He is the current Member of National Assembly of Quebec for the riding of Vimont in the Laval region. He is a member of the Quebec Liberal Party and Parliamentary Secretary to the Minister of Municipal Affairs and Regions and to the Deputy Prime Minister.

Auclair went to the Université de Montréal and obtained a bachelor's degree in economics before studying at the University of Ottawa in which he obtained a license and diploma in law. He was then a notary for nearly 10 years.

Auclair entered politics in 2002 when he was Liberal candidate for Vimont in a by-election but lost to the Action démocratique du Québec. However, in the 2003 elections, he was elected the MNA and named the parliamentary secretary to the minister of employment, social solidarity and family from 2003 and 2005 and parliamentary secretary to the minister of municipal affairs from 2005 to today. He was re-elected for a second term in 2007.

External links
 

1965 births
Living people
Politicians from Laval, Quebec
Quebec notaries
Quebec Liberal Party MNAs
University of Ottawa alumni
Université de Montréal alumni
21st-century Canadian politicians